Gasenyi is a town in Karongi District, Western Province, Rwanda, located between the Gitesi and Mutuntu sectors. The population in 2012 was over 3000. It contains the Karongi Tea Factory, the  Musango Health Center, and a secondary school called ES Gasenyi.

References 

Western Province, Rwanda
Geography of Rwanda
Populated places in Rwanda